Kevin O'Neill is a Gaelic footballer. He plays for his local club Moorefield and was a member of the senior Kildare county team from 2006 to 2010. In April 2010, O'Neill opted out of McGeeney's team but returned a month later.

References

External links
 http://www.gaainfo.com/players/football/kildare/Kevin%20O%27Neill.php

Year of birth missing (living people)
Living people
Kildare inter-county Gaelic footballers
Moorefield Gaelic footballers